The Exos, originally designated RM-86 and later PWN-4, was a sounding rocket developed by the University of Michigan and NACA for use by the United States Air Force.

History 
Developed by the University of Michigan for use by the Air Force Cambridge Research Center, Exos used a three-stage configuration, consisting of a first-stage rocket from an Honest John rocket, a second stage from a Nike-Ajax surface-to-air missile, and a Thiokol XM19 upper stage. It was designated XRM-86 in April 1959, and redesignated PWN-4A in June 1963.

Utilising a rail launcher, the first launch of a full Exos vehicle took place in June 1958, launched from the Wallops Flight Facility. Eight operational launches took place between 1960 and 1965, launched from Eglin Air Force Base.

Launch history

References

Citations

Bibliography 

Sounding rockets of the United States
Equipment of the United States Air Force
University of Michigan